The Apollo sharkminnow (Luciosoma spilopleura) is a species of cyprinid fish found in Thailand, Sumatra and Borneo.

References

Luciosoma
Danios
Fish described in 1855